Spring Is Sprung is an album by American jazz saxophonist Gerry Mulligan's Quartet featuring performances recorded in late 1962 and first released on the Philips label.

Reception

AllMusic awarded the album 4 stars stating: "Mulligan and Brookmeyer always seem to stimulate one another's playing to a high level, and this album is no exception".

Track listing
All compositions by Gerry Mulligan except as indicated
 "Jive at Five" (Count Basie, Harry Edison) - 6:24 	
 "Four for Three" - 4:58
 "17 Mile Drive" - 4:57
 "Subterranean Blues" - 9:41 	
 "Spring Is Sprung" - 6:42 	
 "Open Country" (Bob Brookmeyer) - 4:30

Personnel
Gerry Mulligan - baritone saxophone, piano, track 5
Bob Brookmeyer - valve trombone, piano, track 4
Bill Crow - bass
Gus Johnson - drums

References

Gerry Mulligan albums
1963 albums
Philips Records albums
Albums produced by Quincy Jones